The 1943 Washington Senators won 84 games, lost 69, and finished in second place in the American League. They were managed by Ossie Bluege and played home games at Griffith Stadium.

Offseason 
 January 29, 1943: Bill Zuber and cash were traded by the Senators to the New York Yankees for Milo Candini and Jerry Priddy.

Regular season

Season standings

Record vs. opponents

Roster

Player stats

Batting

Starters by position 
Note: Pos = Position; G = Games played; AB = At bats; H = Hits; Avg. = Batting average; HR = Home runs; RBI = Runs batted in

Other batters 
Note: G = Games played; AB = At bats; H = Hits; Avg. = Batting average; HR = Home runs; RBI = Runs batted in

Pitching

Starting pitchers 
Note: G = Games pitched; IP = Innings pitched; W = Wins; L = Losses; ERA = Earned run average; SO = Strikeouts

Other pitchers 
Note: G = Games pitched; IP = Innings pitched; W = Wins; L = Losses; ERA = Earned run average; SO = Strikeouts

Relief pitchers 
Note: G = Games pitched; W = Wins; L = Losses; SV = Saves; ERA = Earned run average; SO = Strikeouts

Farm system 

Chattanooga franchise transferred and renamed, July 11, 1943

Notes

References 
1943 Washington Senators at Baseball-Reference
1943 Washington Senators team page at www.baseball-almanac.com

Minnesota Twins seasons
Washington Senators season
Washington